Agasarahalli  is a village in the southern part of India, Karnataka. It is located in the Nelamangala taluk of Bangalore Rural district in Karnataka. The Agasarahalli village had population of 263 of which 128 are males while 135 are females as per Population Census 2011.

See also
 Bangalore Rural
 Districts of Karnataka

References

External links
 https://bangalorerural.nic.in/en/

Villages in Bangalore Rural district